Lyonetia melanochalca is a moth in the family Lyonetiidae.

Distribution
It is known from Khasis, India.

This species has a wingspan of 8–11 mm.

References

Lyonetiidae
Moths described in 1911